Aaron McGrath is an Aboriginal Australian television and film actor known for various roles including Redfern Now, The Code, Glitch and Jasper Jones.

Filmography

Film

Television

References

External links
 

Living people
21st-century Australian male actors
Australian male film actors
Australian male television actors
Indigenous Australian male actors
Year of birth missing (living people)